Vikki Breese-Iverson (born 1973/1974) is an American politician and businesswoman serving as the minority leader of the Oregon House of Representatives. A Republican, she represents the 55th district, which includes Prineville in Central Oregon.

Early life
Breese-Iverson grew up in Central Oregon and graduated from Crook County High School in 1992.

Career 
Breese-Iverson joined the 80th Oregon Legislative Assembly after being appointed on August 8, 2019 to replace Mike McLane. She owns a real estate business in Prineville. She had previously worked for former Oregon State Senator Ted Ferrioli and former Oregon State House Speaker Karen Minnis.

She won re-election in 2020 by a large margin, 73.5% of the vote. 

Breese-Iverson has cast doubt on the validity of the 2020 presidential election results.

On December 11, 2020, Breese-Iverson and 11 other state Republican officials signed a letter requesting Oregon Attorney General Ellen Rosenblum join Texas and other states contesting the results of the 2020 presidential election in Texas v. Pennsylvania. Rosenblum announced she had filed in behalf of the defense, and against Texas, the day prior.

In 2021, Breese-Iverson sent a letter to Secretary of State Shemia Fagan, requesting that a "full forensic audit" of Oregon's 2020 elections. In November 2021, she signed a letter along with other Republicans around the nation calling for an audit of the 2020 election in all states.

On November 30, 2021, Breese-Iverson became the House minority leader, after Christine Drazan stepped down from the office to run for governor.

Personal life 
She married Bryan Iverson in 2005 in Prineville. They own a ranch and have two sons.

References

Living people
Republican Party members of the Oregon House of Representatives
1973 births
1974 births